The Tennessee Intercollegiate State Legislature (TISL) is an annual legislative session conducted by college students from across Tennessee, providing students over with an education about Tennessee state government and a channel to express their opinions on state issues.

This model legislature convenes in the State Capitol for four days, typically in November. It consists of a Senate and a House of Representatives, which debate bills that are produced wholly by the students.  The Supreme Court consists of judges and lawyers participating in the Appellate Moot Court Collegiate Challenge (AMC3). Students also have the option to work as lobbyists or members of the media.

During each General Assembly, officers are elected to serve on the Executive Council that governs the organization for the following year. The Executive Council chooses from ten bills that have passed in both the House and the Senate and designates them as Priority Legislation to be presented to the Tennessee General Assembly. Many of TISL's bills have become state law.

History 
The history of the Tennessee Intercollegiate State Legislature is a story of students taking the initiative and providing leadership to organize themselves for learning about state government and expressing their views on state issues.

In 1966, Dr. Douglas Carlisle, a political science professor at the University of Tennessee at Knoxville, approached the Student Government Association with the concept of TISL. Dr. Carlisle was familiar with similar programs in North Carolina and South Carolina.

Events of the 1960s were important to TISL's founding. President John F. Kennedy's emphasis on student activism motivated young people across the nation before he was assassinated in 1963. His death heightened the resolve of many students to participate and make a difference.  Important federal laws under President Lyndon Johnson such as the Civil Rights Act of 1964, the Voting Rights Act of 1965 and other far-reaching programs were focusing attention on the role of government. Student activism over the Vietnam War was growing.

It was also an exciting time in Tennessee politics.  In Nashville, the Tennessee General Assembly was demonstrating the first stirrings of independence after decades under the control of the governor's office. The 1962 Baker v. Carr decision, a Tennessee case of national significance, led to the first redistricting of the legislature since 1900. This, in turn, produced a flood of new state senators and state representatives to change the political dynamic.

The legislature also began annual sessions after voters approved a constitutional amendment changing the legislative calendar. Consequently, Tennesseans were paying more attention to their state government than they'd paid in a long time. Republican Howard Baker's election to the U.S. Senate in 1966 introduced two-party competition for statewide offices and raised interest in politics.

The UTK student most intrigued with the TISL concept was Phillip Moffitt. Together, Moffitt and Dr. Carlisle contacted other student government associations across the state. At Vanderbilt University, they caught the interest of student Charles Bone. Bone and Moffitt were to become the first and second governors of TISL.

Records suggest that an organizational meeting occurred on the Vanderbilt campus in the spring or summer of 1966. The 1st General Assembly occurred in the fall at the State Capitol. Since that time, TISL has convened in nearly every academic year. The General Assembly has been displaced from the Capitol occasionally, usually because of construction. It has sometimes met in the auditorium of the War Memorial Building and in committee rooms of the Legislative Plaza.

The Tennessee Intercollegiate State Legislature Foundation was incorporated in 1976 under TISL Governor David Lillard Jr. and received a 501(c)(3) classification from the Internal Revenue Service a year later as a further result of Lillard's work.

In 2014, the record for most colleges in attendance was broken.  With 43 colleges and universities in attendance, the 45th General Assembly of the Tennessee Intercollegiate State Legislature was the largest group of students to attend the conference.

Officers

Executive Council
The ten-member Executive Council manages TISL through the year and prepares for the next General Assembly.  Officers are ambassadors for TISL, which means they frequently call on other campuses, university administrators and state officials.  Officers’ duties and responsibilities are enumerated in Article V of the TISL Constitution.

The Executive Council consists of the Governor, Lieutenant Governor, Secretary of State, State Treasurer, Speaker of the House of Representatives, Speaker Pro Tempore of the House of Representatives, Speaker Pro Tempore of the Senate, Attorney General, Lobbying Director, and Chief Justice of the Tennessee Intercollegiate Supreme Court.

The current officers were elected at the 53rd General Assembly to serve a one-year term. The current officers are:

Support Staff
In addition to the Executive Council, various other officers and support staff are appointed to help the Executive Council with the management of the different components of TISL.  The Speakers of each chamber appoint a Chief Clerk to oversee the flow of legislation and keep records while in session.  There is also a Deputy Clerk (and in some cases an Assistant Clerk) who help the Chief Clerk in his/her duties.  Both the Secretary of State and State Treasurer appoint Deputies and Assistants to assist them in their responsibilities.  The Supreme Court justices appoint a Chief Clerk and Marshall to oversee paperwork and records of the AMC3 competition.  There are also a number of law clerks and courtroom clerks that help the AMC3 program function.  A Director of Lobbying is appointed to coordinate that program, as well as a Media Director to oversee the media component.  The Governor is assisted by a Chief of Staff and Cabinet, who advise him on bills and convey the Governor's wishes to Senators and Representatives.

TISL Governors: Past & Present
The Governors of TISL and the schools they represented are listed below. The incumbent governor is Paige Foster, and is indicated below in bold.

Notable TISL Alumni
Several alumni of the TISL program have gone into government and public serve in Tennessee and other states.

References

External links 
 The Official TISL Website
Tennessee Intercollegiate Supreme Court
Appellate Moot Court Collegiate Challenge

Education in Tennessee
Educational organizations based in the United States
Organizations established in 1966